Chandigarh Lions was one of the nine teams in the defunct Indian Cricket League. They were one of the six founding teams and were the runners-up in the inaugural Twenty20 Championship, which was won by Chennai Superstars. The team represented Chandigarh, and the captain was Chris Cairns, the former New Zealand all-rounder.

Season performances

References 

Indian Cricket League teams
Cricket clubs established in 2007
Sport in Chandigarh
Former senior cricket clubs of India
2007 establishments in Chandigarh